Chimankend (also, Nizhniy Karabaglyar and Nerkin Karabakhlar) is a former village in the Ararat Province of Armenia, currently part of the rural municipality of Urtsadzor village.

References 

Populated places in Ararat Province

az:Çimənkənd